Michelle Jin (born 1974) is a Chinese American bodybuilder.

Early life

Michelle Jin was born in 1974 in a small village in Wenzhou, Zhejiang. She was raised in a conservative family, where bodybuilding was probably not considered a true career path. In 1987, she moved to the United States. In 1996, she was introduced by a friend to a gym where she began working out and developing her body.

Figure career

 2010 NPC San Francisco Championships - 3rd (Figure B)

Physique career

 2011 NPC Junior Nationals - 16th
 2014 NPC Junior USA - 1st
 2016 IFBB Omaha Pro - 11th
 2017 IFBB Arnold Classic - 16th
 2018 IFBB Champions of Power and Grace - 16th / 12th (Masters 35+)

Bodybuilding career

 2006 NPC Contra Costa (CA) Championships - 2nd (LW)
 2019 IFBB Omaha Pro - 2nd
 2021 IFBB Toronto Pro Supershow - 3rd
 2022 IFBB New York Pro - 3rd
 2022 IFFB Toronto Pro - 2nd

Personal life

Jin currently lives in Hillsborough, North Carolina.

References

1974 births
Chinese American female bodybuilders
Chinese female bodybuilders
Living people
People from Hillsborough, North Carolina
Professional bodybuilders
21st-century American women
20th-century American women